Kermanshah County is in Kermanshah province, Iran. The capital of the county is the city of Kermanshah. At the 2006 census, the county's population was 950,400 in 235,408 households. The following census in 2011 counted 1,030,978 people in 288,260 households. At the 2016 census, the county's population was 1,083,833 in 323,291 households.
A majority in Kermanshah are Shia Muslims, with minorities of Sunni Muslims and believers of Yarsanism.

Administrative divisions

The population history and structural changes of Kermanshah County's administrative divisions over three consecutive censuses are shown in the following table. The latest census shows five districts, 13 rural districts, and four cities.

References

 

Counties of Kermanshah Province